Bruschetta is an antipasto (starter dish) from Italy consisting of grilled bread rubbed with garlic and topped with olive oil and salt. Variations may include toppings of tomato, vegetables, beans, cured meat, or cheese. In Italy, bruschetta is often prepared using a brustolina grill.

Types
A popular dish is bruschetta with tomatoes; one recipe popular outside Italy involves basil, fresh tomato, garlic and onion or mozzarella. Bruschetta is usually served as a snack or appetizer. In some countries, the prepared topping is marketed as bruschetta.

In the Abruzzo region of Italy a variation of bruschetta made with a salame called ventricina is served. Raw pork products and spices encased in pig bladder are aged and the paste spread on open slices of bread which are sometimes grilled. The dish was developed as a way of salvaging bread that was going stale. In Tuscany it is called fettunta and it is usually served without toppings, especially in November, to taste the first oil of the season.

History
Bruschetta originated in Italy during the 15th century. However, the dish can be traced back to Ancient Rome, when olive growers would bring their olives to a local olive press and taste a sample of their freshly pressed oil using a slice of bread.

Etymology

The noun bruschetta (plural bruschette) comes from the Roman dialect verb bruscare, the equivalent of the Italian word abbrustolire which means 'to toast', or 'to roast over coals'. Toasting bread and soaking it with freshly pressed olive oil is "a practice probably as old as Rome itself".

In the United States, the word is sometimes used to refer to a prepared topping, sold in jars and usually tomato-based, instead of the bread, a sense which is unknown in Italian.

See also

 Garlic bread
 Crostini
 Crouton
 List of bread dishes
 List of toast dishes
 Pa amb tomàquet, a similar dish in Catalan cuisine
 Torricado, a similar dish in Portuguese cuisine

Notes and references

External links

 Food Timeline: Bruschetta & Garlic Bread

Italian cuisine
Appetizers
Bread dishes
Toast dishes
Cuisine of Abruzzo